(Latin for 'eternal boy';; sometimes shortened to  and ) in mythology is a child-god who is forever young. In the analytical psychology of Carl Jung, the term is used to describe an older person whose emotional life has remained at an adolescent level, which is also known as "Peter Pan syndrome", a more recent pop-psychology label. In Jung's conception, the  typically leads a "provisional life" due to the fear of being caught in a situation from which it might not be possible to escape. They covet independence and freedom, oppose boundaries and limits, and tend to find any restriction intolerable.

In mythology
In the poem, Ovid addresses the child-god Iacchus as "" and praises him for his role in the Eleusinian mysteries. Iacchus is later identified with the gods Dionysus and Eros. The  is a god of vegetation and resurrection; the god of divine youth, such as Tammuz, Attis, and Adonis.

In Jungian psychology 

Swiss psychiatrist Carl Gustav Jung developed a school of thought called analytical psychology, distinguishing it from the psychoanalysis of Sigmund Freud (1856–1939).

The "positive" side of the  appears as the Divine Child who symbolizes newness, potential for growth, hope for the future. He also foreshadows the hero that he sometimes becomes (e.g. Heracles). The "negative" side is the child-man who refuses to grow up and meet the challenges of life face on, waiting instead for his ship to come in and solve all his problems.
"For the time being one is doing this or that... it is not yet what is really wanted, and there is always the fantasy that sometime in the future the real thing will come about.... The one thing dreaded throughout by such a type of man is to be bound to anything whatever."

"Common symptoms of  psychology are dreams of an imprisonment and similar imagery: chains, bars, cages, entrapment, bondage. Life itself...is experienced as a prison."

One might also speak of a  when describing the masculine side of the female psyche, or a  when speaking of a man's inner feminine component.

Works concerning the  

The hero-child aspect and his relationship to the Great Mother is dealt with in chapters 4 and 5 of Part Two of Symbols of Transformation (CW, vol. 5).

The Problem of the Puer Aeternus is a book based on a series of lectures that Jungian analyst Marie-Louise von Franz gave at the C.G. Jung Institute, Zurich, during the Winter Semester, 1959–1960. In the first eight of twelve lectures, von Franz illustrates the theme of the puer aeternus by examining the story of The Little Prince from the book of the same name by Antoine de Saint-Exupéry. The remaining four lectures are devoted to a study of a German novel by Bruno Goetz, Das Reich ohne Raum ('The Kingdom Without Space'), first published in 1919. Of this novel von Franz says:

The book is a psychological overview of the eternal boy archetype, from its ancient roots to contemporary experience, including a detailed interpretation of J. M. Barrie's popular 1904 play and 1911 novel.

Peter Pan syndrome

Peter Pan syndrome is the popular psychology concept of an adult who is socially immature.  The category is an informal one invoked by laypeople and some psychology professionals in popular psychology. It is not listed in the Diagnostic and Statistical Manual of Mental Disorders, and is not recognized by the American Psychiatric Association as a specific mental disorder.

Psychologist Dan Kiley popularized the Peter Pan syndrome in his 1983 book, The Peter Pan Syndrome: Men Who Have Never Grown Up. His next book, The Wendy Dilemma (1984), advises women romantically involved with "Peter Pans" how to improve their relationships.

See also
Apprentice complex
Kidult
Vulnerable adult
Parasite single
NEET
James Hillman

Notes

Further reading
 Hopcke, Robert H. A Guided Tour of the Collected Works of C.G. Jung. Shambhala, Boston, 1989. 
 Jung, C.G. The Collected Works of C.G. Jung.  Bollingen Series XX, Princeton University Press.  (Twenty Volumes) Translated by R.F.C. Hull (except for Vol. 2)
 Jung, C.G. Answer to Job (from CW 11).  Princeton University Press, 1973.  
 Sharp, Daryl.  Jung Lexicon:  A Primer of Terms & Concepts.  (pp 109 – 110).  Inner City Books, Toronto, 1991.  
 von Franz, Marie-Louise.
 Yeoman, Ann.  Now or Neverland:  Peter Pan and the Myth of Eternal Youth (A Psychological Perspective on a Cultural Icon).   Inner City Books, Toronto, 1998.

External links

 Syndrome de Peter Pan French website

Jungian archetypes
Analytical psychology
Mythological archetypes
Syndrome
Syndromes
Complex (psychology)
Youth
Carl Jung